South Rupununi Sign Language is an indigenous village sign language used in at least seven Wapishana villages with a high degree of congenital deafness. The villages are located south of the town of Lethem in the Rupununi savannah of Guyana and Brazil.

References

External links
Ben Braithwaite, Lily Kwok & Rehana Omardeen, Documenting sign language in South Rupununi, Guyana

Village sign languages
Languages of Guyana